The Senegal women's national volleyball team represents Senegal in international women's volleyball competitions and friendly matches.

Its best result was 4th place at the 2015 and  2017 Women's African Volleyball Championships.

The team lastly qualified for the 2021 Women's African Nations Volleyball Championship.

References

External links
 Senegal Volleyball Federation

National women's volleyball teams
Volleyball
Volleyball in Senegal